Ela is an unincorporated community in Swain County, North Carolina, United States, located along US 19, northwest of Whittier and east of Bryson City. The name is derived from ᎡᎳᏬᏗ (Elawodi) in the Cherokee language, which translates as "yellow hill."

Ela was once the junction of the Appalachian Railway (1906-1935) and Southern Railway's Murphy Branch.

References

External links
USGS: Ela

Unincorporated communities in Swain County, North Carolina
Unincorporated communities in North Carolina
Communities of the Great Smoky Mountains